{{DISPLAYTITLE:Gamma3 Octantis}}

Gamma3 Octantis, Latinized from γ3 Octantis, is a solitary star located in the southern circumpolar constellation Octans. It is faintly visible to the naked eye as an orange-hued star with an apparent magnitude of 5.28. At its current distance, Gamma3 Octantis' brightness is diminished by two tenths of a magnitude due to interstellar dust and Eggen (1993) lists it as a member of the old disk population. It has an absolute magnitude of +0.83.

Gamma3 Octantis has a stellar classification of K1/2 III, indicating that it is an evolved K-type star with the characteristics of a K1 and K2 giant star. It is a red clump star that is currently on the horizontal branch, fusing helium at its core. At present it has 2.23 times the mass of the Sun but has expanded to almost 10 times its girth. It radiates 50.5 times the luminosity of the Sun from its enlarged photosphere at an effective temperature of 4,879 K, which gives it a yellowish-orange glow.

References

Octans
K-type giants
Horizontal-branch stars
Octantis, Gamma3
000636
000814
0030
PD-82 00004
Octantis, 1